Toell the Great in Estonian mythology is a great giant hero who lived on the Baltic Sea island of Saaremaa.

Legend 

He lived in Tõlluste village with his wife Piret. He tossed huge rocks everywhere, mostly aiming for his archenemy Vanatühi or other enemies of Saaremaa people. Tõll was king of Saaremaa but he lived as a common farmer. He often visited his brother Leiger on the neighboring Hiiumaa (Dagö) island. He was so tall that he could almost walk there (The Soela strait has passageways only 2-3m deep, and is about 6km across). His walking stick was a 5 fathom spruce tree trunk.

Tõll was always kind and ready to help, but very hot-tempered. He loved to eat cabbage, drink beer and go to the sauna (his wife was always busy gathering him sauna stove rocks).

Death 
When an enemy decapitated him, he put his head on his sword and walked to his grave, which is supposed to be somewhere in Tõlluste. When Tõll died, he promised to rise from grave and help people in case of war. But naughty children made fun of him by yelling "Tõll, Tõll, wake up, there is a war in the yard". Tõll rose, grew angry and went back to his grave, swearing never to come back.

Theories 
It is supposed that stories about Toell the Great are based on historical very tall elder of Saaremaa. Sometimes he is connected with local German (or Germanized) noble family Toll. Some members of that family are told to have been very tall (more than 2.10 meters). Tõll and Toll can be found as surnames in present day Saaremaa.

Modern day 
In Ninase village there are two old windmills reshaped into the figures or Tõll and Piret. Newlyweds of Saaremaa go there to pay tribute to the mythical heroes of their island.

 Toell the Great has inspired the cartoon movie Suur Tõll (Tallinnfilm 1980).
 Icebreaker Suur Tõll is a museum ship in Tallinn.
 As of 2009, three of Estonia's most high class hotels (Pädaste Manor, Swissôtel Tallinn, and Hotel Schlossle) have begun to offer the Suur Tõll special to tourists upon request. This consists of a six-hour, custom-tailored sauna session and three cabbage-inspired meals per day, complete with two pints of some of Estonia's finest beers.

References 

Estonian mythology
Estonian folklore
Saaremaa
Estonian giants